George Philip Meier House, also known as Tuckaway, is a historic home located at Indianapolis, Indiana.  It was built in 1907, and is a two-story, Bungalow / American Craftsman style frame dwelling clad in cedar clapboard.  The second story was added in 1912.  It has a front gable roof and features a full width front porch and scrolled brackets on the overhanging eaves.

It was listed on the National Register of Historic Places in 1982.

References

Houses on the National Register of Historic Places in Indiana
Bungalow architecture in Indiana
Houses completed in 1907
Houses in Indianapolis
National Register of Historic Places in Indianapolis